Aubrey Lee Layne, Jr. (born June 19, 1956) is an American businessman who served as the Virginia Secretary of Finance from 2018 to 2021. He was previously appointed by Governor Terry McAuliffe, to the Commonwealth Transportation Board for a five-year term and later served as Virginia Secretary of Transportation in McAuliffe's administration. Layne was subsequently appointed as Virginia Secretary of Finance by Governor-elect Ralph Northam.

Born in Newport News, Layne attended the University of Richmond and received a Master of Business Administration degree from Old Dominion University.

References

1956 births
Living people
State cabinet secretaries of Virginia
Old Dominion University alumni
University of Richmond alumni
Politicians from Newport News, Virginia
Politicians from Virginia Beach, Virginia
Virginia Republicans